Donggukyeojiseungram or ShinjeungDonggukyeojiseungram is a Korean geography book that was published by the Joseon dynasty in 1530. The only printed version of the book is currently located in Kyoto University, however the original wooden print is in Kyujanggak.

History
The project was originally created in 1481 based on Chinese sources. In 1530, it added five more books and made the series as an expanded edition thus the word shinjeung (新增) was added to indicate the expansion of content, with the total of 55 books. The book was more of a guidebook for a separate map rather than actual cartography. Each book started with the drawing of the overall view of the regions covered, and wrote about the history, customs, temples, mausoleums, palaces and administrative quarters and educational institutions thereafter. The book contained prologues written by Confucian scholars of the times.

Content
The regions that were covered are the same as below.

References

1530 books
Geography of Korea